Gerak Khas is a Malaysian police procedural television drama series broadcast on Radio Televisyen Malaysia (RTM) and TV3. The series follows the crime-fighting efforts of the eponymous unit, led by SAC Datuk Helmi (Yusof Haslam), from murders to the terrorism and many other crimes which committed in Malaysia. Gerak Khas, which ran from April 5, 1999, and ended on March 27, 2021, spanning 20 seasons and 1054 episodes, has become the longest-running primetime drama series on Malaysian television.

Series overview
Gerak Khas centers on murders, bank robberies, loan sharks, terrorists, kidnappings, drug trafficking, money laundering and other crimes where it committed in Malaysia, wherein the eponymous unit within the Royal Malaysia Police (PDRM) was called to handling these particular cases. Though some of the series' episodes were fictitious, there have been some episodes based on a true story.

Datuk Yusof Haslam directed both the series and its film adaptations and produced by his company, Skop Productions. Gerak Khas went undergone major changes to its cast members, with exception from Yusof, AC Mizal, A. Galak, Farid Amirul, Deen Maidin, Shaharon Anuar and Abby Abadi as the original cast members since its inception. The series receive recognition from The Malaysia Book of Records as the country's longest running television drama series.

The series went on hiatus in 2011 after 13th season was aired on that year. Metro Skuad, a similar true crime series (also produced by Yusof), was created as an interim replacement of Gerak Khas and ran for two seasons aired from 2012 to 2013. Gerak Khas was subsequently revived in 2014, with its 14th season (the first season in three years) began airing on 14 February.

In 2018, it is reported that AC Mizal will be reprise his role as Mazlan after he left the series in 2002, but he declined as Yusof Haslam says "let his involvement in Gerak Khas become a nostalgia". Reruns of the series' seasons 11 and 15 were broadcast on TV2 from December 2019 until January 2021.

Due to the worldwide COVID-19 pandemic and the nationwide movement control order, Gerak Khas suspended from airing in February 2020 which resulting the abruption of its production and replaced by the reruns of the series 19th season. Filming resumed in late June 2020.

Yusof Haslam announced in an interview with Berita Harian that Gerak Khas will end production after historic 20-year run with its 20th and final season began airing on TV3 on December 4, 2020, under the title Gerak Khas The Finale after previous 19 seasons aired on RTM. After the series' conclusion, a spin-off series, Gerak Khas Undercover began airing on TV3 starting October 1, 2021.

Cast and characters
The following list below are the Gerak Khas actors (does not include the movies):

Final line-up
 Datuk Yusof Haslam as DCP Datuk Helmi (1999–2011, 2014–2021)
 Deen Maidin as S.M. Lingam (1999–2011, 2014–2021)
 Farid Amirul as Sub Insp Lim (1999–2011, 2019–2021)
 Shaharon Anuar as SAC Saiful (1999–2001, 2019–2021)
 Abby Abadi as DSP Aleza (1999–2011, 2019–2021)
 Norman Hakim as ACP Haris (2003–2009, 2014, 2017–2021)
 Z. Zamri as Sergeant Zaidi (2003–2011, 2014–2021)
 C. Kumaresan as DSP Kumar (2004–2011, 2014–2021)
 Salina Saibi as ASP Salina (2007 as guest star, 2008–2011 as regular cast, 2014–2021)
 Sheera Iskandar as Inspector Sheera (2007 as guest star, 2008–2011 as regular cast, 2016 also as guest star, 2017–2021)
 Erra Fazira as ASP Jeslina (2018–2021)
 Ungku Ismail Aziz as Inspector Daniel (2020–2021)
 Izzat Mushtaq as Inspector Izzat (2020–2021)

Former cast
 AC Mizal as Inspector Mazlan (1999–2002)
 Zulkifli Ismail as Supt. Razlan (2001–2011)
 A. Galak as Sub Inspector Hashim (retired, now working as a taxi driver) (1999–2011, 2014–2021)
 Elly Mazlein as Detective Mazlein (2002–2005)
 Haliza Misbun as Inspector Jeslina (2003)
 Angeline Tan as Chief Inspector Geena (2004–2011)
 Dynas Mokhtar as Inspector Julia (2006–2009)
 Shah Iskandar as Inspector Hisham (2009 as guest star; 2010–2011 as regular cast)
 Rozita Che Wan as DSP Zita (2009–2010)
 Hanny Harmi as Detective Linda/Hani (2008, 2014–2015)
 NurHuda Ali as Detective Amy (2010–2011)
 Rebecca Nur Islam as Detective Salina (2005)
 Avaa Vanja as Detective Sofia (2006)
 Afiq Muiz as ASP Rosli (2014–2015)
 Nizen Ayob as Inspector Nizam (2014–2017)1
 Syamsul Yusof as Supritendant Jefri (2006–2009 as guest star, 2015-2018 as regular cast)
 Tisha Shamsir as Inspector Tisha (2014–2017)
 Mas Khan as Detective Kamal (2014–2017)
 Mimifly as Inspector Adira (2015)
 Raja Ilya as Inspector Shakila (2015–2018)
 Nancie Foo as ACP Suzy (2015)
 Fattah Amin as Inspector Haikal (2016–2017)
 Ken Abdullah as Detective Ken (2016)
 Azar Azmi as Detective Amira (2017)
 Hisyam Hamid as Inspector Aiman (2018)
 Ruzzlan Abdullah Shah as Detective Wong (2018)1
 Zul Ariffin as Inspector Ashraf (2009–2011, 2019)
 Mustaqim Bahadon as Detective Mustafa (2019)

Guests

From 1999 to 2011 and from 2014 to 2021, Gerak Khas features some of well-known Malaysian actors as a guest cast in each episode. There are also some guest casts who appeared in more than one episode.

Notes: All guest casts were listed in alphabetical order.

Notes
1 deceased.

Episodes

Film adaptation
The success of Gerak Khas led to its film adaptations. There are three films based from the series:

 Gerak Khas the Movie (2001)
 Gerak Khas the Movie II (2002)
 GK3 The Movie (2005)

The first movie, released in early 2001, topped the Malaysian box office. In the first film, they faced crime bosses Castelo (Rosyam Nor) and Rafayel (Norman Hakim), whom Abadi married in 2002; he returned to the franchise playing Chief Inspector Haris).

In its storyline, Aleeza was jealous of Mazlan's relationship with Inspektor Shafikah (Erra Fazira). However, in the sequel, Mazlan was jealous of Aleeza and new member Inspektor Zamri (Azri Iskandar), whom he also suspected of being corrupt.

Awards
 2009: Longest Running Drama Series by The Malaysia Book of Records
 2009: Anugerah Skrin 2009 for Best Drama (nominated)
 2019: Anugerah MeleTOP Era 2019 for Drama MeleTOP

Spin off 
After 8 months Gerak Khas The Finale (reboot/series) end, new Gerak Khas but spin off called Undercover and starring by Aaron Aziz, Elizabeth Tan, Ruzana Ibrahim, Eizlan Yusof include comeback former Gerak Khas actor AC Mizal and Gerak Khas The Movie 1 Rosyam Nor also beside a few lineup from The Finale. Aired on 1 October 2021 TV3

See also
 Television series similar to Gerak Khas:
 Ang Probinsyano – Philippine police procedural drama series
 C.I.D. – Indian police procedural drama series
 Tatort – German police procedural drama series
 CSI: Crime Scene Investigation – American police procedural drama series
 Cold Squad – Canadian police procedural drama series

Notes

References

Malaysian drama television series
Police procedural television series
1999 Malaysian television series debuts
2011 Malaysian television series endings
2014 Malaysian television series debuts
2021 Malaysian television series endings
Television shows set in Kuala Lumpur
Television shows set in Indonesia
Television shows set in Bangkok
Television shows set in London
Television shows set in South Korea
Law enforcement in fiction
Television productions suspended due to the COVID-19 pandemic